Hoehne is an unincorporated town, a post office, and a census-designated place (CDP) located in and governed by Las Animas County, Colorado, United States. The Hoehne post office has the ZIP Code 81046 (post office boxes). At the United States Census 2010, the population of the Hoehne CDP was 111.

History
Hoehne was founded by German immigrant William Hoehne in 1859 in what was then the Territory of New Mexico. He is credited with founding the Hoehne Ditch Company and introducing the first mill and threshing machine into the area. William Hoehne farmed , planting strawberries, apples, and cherries. Hoehne is still a farming community, but the focus has shifted from fruits to alfalfa and grass hay.

The population of Hoehne today is slightly more than 100 people. But during its heyday, the town boasted a hotel, a train depot called "Hoehnes", a blacksmith, a Catholic church, and several stores. The train depot was retired in 1967 and was moved twice - the second time to its current location in Texas Creek, where it was restored to its original condition. The Hoehnes train depot sign is still visible today at the original depot location.

Hoehne is located near the Santa Fe Trail, and a historical marker is located approximately one mile north of the town on County Road 42.0.

Geography
Hoehne is located in west-central Las Animas County on high ground north of the Purgatoire River.

Demographics

Notable residents
 Ventura Tenario, known as Chief Little Wolf, professional wrestler in USA, Australia, and New Zealand.

See also

Outline of Colorado
Index of Colorado-related articles
State of Colorado
Colorado cities and towns
Colorado census designated places
Colorado counties
Las Animas County, Colorado

References

External links

Hoehne @ UncoverColorado.com
Hoehne @ Sangres.com
Hoehne School District
Las Animas County website

Census-designated places in Las Animas County, Colorado
Census-designated places in Colorado
1859 establishments in New Mexico Territory